The Karnataka State Football Association (abbreviated KSFA), formerly the Mysore Football Association, is one of the 37 Indian state football associations that are affiliated to the All India Football Federation. It is the organization that administers association football in the Indian state of Karnataka. The men's and women's professional leagues operate under it. Since January 2017, N. A. Haris has been serving as the president.

Background 
Karnataka State Football Association (KSFA) is the governing body for football in the state of Karnataka. It was started in the year of 1908, which was then known as Mysore Football Association (MFA).

Presidents 
 Major F Ward (1933)
 D. Gunabhushanam (1950–51; 1954–61)
 Mir Iqbal Hussain (1965–76; 1981–88)
 A. R. Khaleel (1989–2017)
 N. A. Haris (2017–present)

Competitions

Men's club

Women's club

See also 
 Karnataka football team

References

Football governing bodies in India
Football in Karnataka
Organisations based in Bangalore
1908 establishments in India
Sports organizations established in 1908